Delebio (Delébi in lombard) is a comune (municipality) in the Province of Sondrio in the Italian region Lombardy, located about  northeast of Milan and about  west of Sondrio.

Delebio borders the following municipalities: Andalo Valtellino, Colico, Dubino, Pagnona, Piantedo, Premana, Rogolo.

It was the location of the Battle of Delebio in 1432.

References

Cities and towns in Lombardy